Tserovo is a village in Blagoevgrad Municipality, in Blagoevgrad Province, Bulgaria. It is situated in Rila mountain 7 kilometers southwest of Blagoevgrad. Cultivating tobacco and sheep and goat farming  are the only sources of income for the village.

South of the village on the hills over the left bank of Struma river there are ruins of the mountainous fortress "Tserovo", built in the 3rd century.

References

See also 

Wikimapia for the village with the fortress

Villages in Blagoevgrad Province